Harold C. Lear Jr. (January 31, 1935 – June 25, 2016) was an American professional basketball player.

A  guard born in Philadelphia, Lear starred at Temple University in his hometown during the 1950s.  He earned the NCAA basketball tournament Most Outstanding Player in 1956 after leading Temple to the Final Four, where they lost to the University of Iowa.

After college, Lear was selected by the Philadelphia Warriors with the seventh pick of the 1956 NBA draft.  His NBA career was brief, however: he appeared in just three games during the 1956–57 NBA season and scored four points. He played for the Easton Madisons of the Eastern Professional Basketball League (EPBL) and was named the league's Most Valuable Player in 1957. He was a four-time selection to the All-EPBL First Team and two-time selection to the Second Team.

In 2013, Temple retired his No. 6 jersey. Lear died on June 25, 2016 at his home in White Plains, New York after an illness.

References

1935 births
2016 deaths
All-American college men's basketball players
American men's basketball players
Philadelphia Warriors draft picks
Philadelphia Warriors players
Pittsburgh Rens players
Point guards
Temple Owls men's basketball players
Basketball players from Philadelphia